Bois-Franc is a residential neighbourhood in the borough of Saint-Laurent in Montreal that was designed by the architect Louis Sauer.

History 
Bois-Franc is built on land sold by Bombardier Aerospace that used to be Cartierville Airport.

Transportation
Bois-Franc is bordered by four boulevards: Henri Bourassa Boulevard to the north, Marcel Laurin Boulevard to the east,  Cavendish Avenue to the west, and Thimens Boulevard to the southwest.

Bois Franc train station is relatively nearby.

References 

Neighbourhoods in Montreal
Saint-Laurent, Quebec
Populated places established in 1993
Planned communities in Canada